This is a list of the National Register of Historic Places listings in Baltimore County, Maryland.

This is intended to be a complete list of the properties and districts on the National Register of Historic Places in Baltimore County, Maryland, United States. Latitude and longitude coordinates are provided for many National Register properties and districts; these locations may be seen together in a map.

There are 89 properties and districts listed on the National Register in the county, including 2 National Historic Landmarks.  As an independent city, the city of Baltimore is entirely separate from Baltimore County; its National Register-listed properties and districts are listed separately.

Current listings

|}

Former listing

|}

See also

 List of National Historic Landmarks in Maryland
 National Register of Historic Places listings in Maryland

References

 
Baltimore